The Przebraże Defence – defensive fights in the village of Przebraże (now Гайове, Ukraine) belonging to the Trościaniec cluster, in Lutsk poviat, voivodeship in Volhynia between July 1943 and January 1944. In Przebraże, Polish civilians from Volhynia organized defense against the UPA. The village was never conquered by UPAs.

Location
The geographic area featured numerous peat bogs and forests. The Konopla river was to the west of the settlement. The population consisted of Poles, who had settled there in the 17th century. They were descendants of several szlachta (Polish nobility) families, that came to Volhynia from Mazowsze. The surrounding villages were inhabited mostly by ethnic Ukrainians. In 1938, Przebraże had 200 houses and some 1,150 inhabitants.

Background
In late 1942, Ukrainian nationalists began attacks on Polish settlements in Volhynia (see: Massacres of Poles in Volhynia). Throughout 1943, these incidents moved westwards from one county to another, reaching the area of Kowel in May. The Polish population and the weak Volhynian units of the Polish Home Army were taken by surprise. After the initial shock, however, the Poles started to organize their own units to attack Ukrainians in turn. The Polish 27th Home Army Infantry Division was created out of these units.

Creation
Some time in April 1943, Poles in Przebraże under former officers 'Harry' Henryk Cybulski and Ludwik Malinowski (a veteran of the Polish–Soviet War), decided to create a self-defence force, which would help them to resist future Ukrainian attacks. The area in question was vast, with several surrounding smaller settlements, such as Cholopiny, Jazwiny, Mosty and Zagajnik. Sentries were posted, armed with weapons found in the fields after the border battles of the 1941 German invasion of the Soviet Union and Sten guns made by the Prżebraze gunsmithery. The regional Armia Krajowa also supplied arms and money so that Poles could buy weapons from corrupt Hungarian soldiers stationed in Volhynia. Two 45mm cannons were salvaged from Soviet tanks that had been destroyed in June 1941 and mounted on carriages. A train driver with AK contacts also delivered arms to the Polish railwaymen at Kiwerce, which were then transported to Przebraze.

To avoid clashes with the Germans, a weapon permit from local German authorities in Kiwerce was obtained. According to the memoirs of Henryk Cybulski, the German commander of Kiwerce was bribed with a pig and gold jewelry, after which he signed a document that stated: "Hereby authorized inhabitants of the village of Przebraże are allowed to use weapons to fight forest gangs, which harm [the] interests of the German Reich".

Polish units in Przebraże numbered some 500 men, they were divided into four companies and a mounted scouts platoon. In mid-1943 their number grew to 1,000. Reconnaissance patrols would check the surrounding area by day and at night, so that the settlement would not be caught by surprise. A defence line was created around Przebraże and neighbouring settlements, which consisted of foxholes and barbed wire.

Population in 1943
As news of atrocities spread across Volhynia, up to 28,000 Poles from neighbouring villages and settlements came to Przebraże. The number of refugees grew day by day; several houses accommodated up to five families, others had to live in temporary mud huts. A field hospital was organized and as skirmishes with Ukrainians were frequent, beds were usually full.

In June 1943 Polish units from Przebraże scouted the area, telling all Poles to leave their houses and move to the fortified settlement. Unfortunately, not all agreed to move and their reluctance later proved to be fatal.

Ukrainian UPA attacks
At the beginning of the summer of 1943, local Ukrainian Insurgent Army (UPA) commanders suggested that Henryk Cybulski, Ludwik Malinowski and their men should meet and talk. Delegates of both sides met four times, the Poles grew suspicious. Reportedly, the talks were a trap, the Ukrainians wanted to kill Cybulski. Thus, negotiations were terminated.

July 5, 1943 attack
On July 5, 1943, UPA units tried to attack Przebraże, burning nearby villages and murdering their inhabitants. Shocked refugees would come to the settlement, often only dressed in their underwear. The defence line was then attacked in several places, the battle lasting throughout the night. The next day, July 6, was just as hectic, as Ukrainian units surrounded the settlement and attacked it from all sides. After several hours they gave up, 10 Poles died.

As soon as the Ukrainians had left, mounted scouts scoured the area. They counted as many as 550 massacred Poles, those who had refused to move to Prżebraze. The surrounding villages, such as Majdan Jezierski, Dermanka, Budy, Huta and Dobra, were burned.

Other attacks
A second attack took place on July 12, the UPA concentrated its forces on the village of Rafalowka. The Polish side managed to force the enemy to flee, but this was not the end. As Henryk Cybulski wrote in his memoirs, throughout the summer of 1943 the "war for grain" persisted. The number of Poles in Przebraże was too high and its defenders realized that it was impossible to feed so many people. Thus, in April and July 1943, Polish peasants, guarded by patrols, were harvesting crops, transporting it to the settlement. The Ukrainians would attack the peasants, killing several.

The last major attack took place on August 31, 1943. Ukrainian forces numbered around 10,000 men, including a 4,000 strong unit from the area of Lviv and 5,000 drafted local peasants, armed with axes and scythes.<ref>Władysław Filar, Przebraże pastion polskiej samoobrony na Wołyniu, 2007 - pages 90/91, based on the master's thesis of Stefan Chojnecki " Samoobrona ludnosc polskiej na Wolyniu w latach 1943-1944",   Henryk Cybulski, " Czerwone noce " 1969 - Atak Na Przebraze, pages 255/256</ref> . They worked out a detailed plan of attack (codename "Kublo"); their headquarters were established in the village of Swozie.

Helped by artillery, they attacked from the south. The Przebraże defenders asked local Home Army units and the Soviet partisan forces of Nikolay Prokopiuk for help, (the latter were numerous in the area and themselves threatened by Ukrainians). They joined the Poles. As a result, the UPA, attacked from the rear, withdrew, losing more than 100 men and abandoning a large quantity of arms.

Raids on UPA bases 
To prevent attacks on Przebraże, the self-defence forces conducted counter-attacks on UPA bases situated in villages close to the base, which constantly posed a gravely threat to its security. On 12 July 1943  after the first attack on the base, Henryk Cybulski led 3 companies on a  raid on the UPA  base in the village of Trościaniec, which lay 7 km to the north, destroying it and dispersing the UPA garrison. On 2 August 1943 a raid destroyed the UPA base at Jaromla, which lay 5 km to the north east.

At the end of September, 1943 a 100-man unit from Przebraże, with the soldiers of the Rafałówka and Komarówek self-defences, conducted a joint counter-attack which destroyed the UPA base at Hauczyce, 8 km south of Przebraże, eliminating  a constant threat to Rafałówka. A raid against the UPA NCO training school in Omelno on 5 October 1943 was carried out as a joint operation with colonel’s Prokopiuk unit. Taking part in it were 300 Polish troops and 150 Soviet partisans, against 200 UPA troops, including 120 UPA students at the school.  The school was destroyed, but UPA lost over 10 men only. A similar action was undertaken on the night of 27/8 October 1943 when a joint party with Prokopiuk’s partisans attacked Słowatycz. UPA losses were several dozen men.  A 100 Uzbek deserters from the German Army, who were serving in the UPA forces were taken prisoner and went over to the Soviet partisans.

A raid against UPA was undertaken around Żurawicz on 26 November 1943. It had a significant impact on the supply of provisions for Przebraże.  After obtaining reconnaissance reports that Ukrainian nationalists in Żurawicz held over 1,000 requisitioned cattle, a large force of about 740 defenders of Przebraże struck the village, seizing the cattle and large quantities of flour and grain. On 31 December 1943 after receiving intelligence information about the upcoming attack on Przebraże, the same unit ambushed a large force of UPA troops moving south on the road to Przebraże. Taken by surprise the UPA troops fled in disorder suffering many losses.

Aftermath
In February 1944, Volhynia was occupied by the Red Army. As the UPA was considered an enemy of the Soviet regime, the Soviet military forces put a stop to the attacks by the UPA.

In 1945 Poles from this part of Volhynia were forced by Soviet authorities to move to the area of Niemodlin, in Opole Voivodeship, the land that had belonged to Germany before the war.

In 2004 Ukrainian authorities cleaned the Polish cemetery. A victory flag, woven by women from Przebraże in September 1943, can be seen in the Museum of the Polish Army in Warsaw.

See also
 Ludwik Malinowski
 Henryk Cybulski
 Kuty (Kąty) defence
 14th Waffen Grenadier Division of the SS Galizien (1st Ukrainian)
 27th Polish Home Army Infantry Division
 Operation Vistula
 Anti-Polonism
 Huta Stepanska
 Janowa Dolina
 Koliyivschyna
 Nachtigall
 Operation Tempest
 Pawłokoma massacre
 Poryck Massacre

 Notes 

Sources
 Władysław Filar, Przebraże bastion polskiej samoobrony na Wołyniu, Rytm Oficyna Wydawnicza, 2007.  
 Henryk Cybulski, Czerwone noce "O powstaniu i przetrwaniu organizacji samoobrony ludnosci polskiej we wsi Przebraże na Wolyniu w latach 1943-1944". Wyd. MON, Warszawa 1969 r., wyd. I. stron 377 Grzegorz Motyka. Ukrainska partyzantka 1942-1960. Rytm Oficyna Wydawnicza, 2006. . Przebraze: strony 328-329, 339, 349.
 Józef Sobiesiak, Prżebraże. Wyd. MON. Warszawa 1969 r. Wyd. I,. wyd. II 1971.
 Filip Ozarowski, Gdy plonal Wolyn, Chicago 1996, 
 Apoloniusz Zawilski, Polskie fronty 1918-1945, t. 1, Warszawa 1997'',

References
 Description of the interbellum Przebraze  (Polish)
 History of Przebraże
 Life of Ludwik Malinowski

Ukraine in World War II
World War II crimes in Poland
Massacres of Poles in Volhynia